A Touch of Blue was David Cassidy's 17th studio album. A bonus disc was included with this album that contained re-recorded versions of Cassidy's previous songs.

Track listing

References

External links
 http://www.davidcassidy.com

2003 albums
David Cassidy albums